Carrapicho Band (pt-br: Starburrs) is a Brazilian music group. Members are natives of the state of Amazonas. Its lead singer has been Zezinho Corrêa. The group has sold a total of more than 15 million records around the world.

History 
Carrapicho was created in 1980 in Manaus. Earlier works were released in forró music style, and they were known throughout the North of Brazil for it. At the end of 1980s, the Parintins Folklore Festival tunes were commonly in their work, but not leaving forró behind. The group worked regionally for fifteen years, until a French singer, Patrick Bruel, heard their song "Tic, Tic Tac" in 1996 and decided to launch it in his country, France, where it reached the number one spot. It also charted in several European countries, including the top 10 in Belgium and Spain.

In Brazil itself, the song was at #34 of the 100 most played songs of that year, and in Canada the song reached its peak of #14 (Nielsen SoundScan).

The band performed their song on national television in Brazil, at the Sistema Brasileiro de Televisão, thanks to Gugu Liberato, a television host of a big show called Domingo Legal. He discovered them on holiday in the summer of 1996 and decided to invite the group to participate on his program in the same year. The group's performance, set to the beat of the Boi music, received good reviews by the audience.

The song was re-recorded with girl group Chilli and produced by German musician and producer Frank Farian: this remix was released in May 1997. A cover of the song has also been made in Russian by the Uyghur singer Murat Nasyrov.

Carrapicho claims to be spreading the Amazonian culture in the world through their music. Currently, as said above, the band plays Forró, a Brazilian music genre and dance, despite not focusing only on folklore themes.

Lead singer Zezinho Corrêa died on February 6, 2021, aged 69, due to COVID-19.

Members
 Zezinho Corrêa – voice (deceased 2021)
 Raimundo Nonato do Nascimento – vocals
 Robby Martins Keys – guitar
 Otavio Rodrigues da Silva – bass
 Edson Ferreira do Vale – accordion
 Charlie Flag – keyboards
 Ronalto Jesus, China and Luciano Caninde – drums

Dancers
 Ianael Santos
 Tatiana Oliveira
 Hira Mesquita
 Hudson Praia

Discography
 1983 – Carrapicho – Continental
 1985 – Carrapicho – Continental
 1987 – Forro Gingado – Continental
 1988 – Jeez! Is It Time – Continental
 1989 – With Jeitinho Sweet – Continental
 1992 – jolt – Continental
 1993 – 13 years of success – Continental
 1994 – Baticundum – Independent
 1995 – Bumbalanço – Independent
 1996 – Greatest Hits – Independent
 1996 – Festa de Boi Bumba – BMG, #9 [POR https://books.google.com.vc/books?hl=pt-PT&id=vgcEAAAAMBAJ]
 1997 – Rebola – BMG
 1998 – I Love – BMG
 2000 – Marrakesh Train – Universal Music
 2001 – People of the Forest – Universal Music
 2002 – Carrapicho no Forró – Universal Music
 2004 – Dirty Dancing – Sound Brazil/Free Sound

References

Manaus
Brazilian musical groups
Musical groups established in 1980
1980 establishments in Brazil